Starry Eyed and Bollock Naked (A Collection of B-Sides) was the first b-side collection by Carter the Unstoppable Sex Machine. It was released in March 1994 and reached 22nd place on the UK charts. The album artwork features an orange Volkswagen Beetle which belonged to Jim Bob at the time of release. The name might or might not be a reference to the King Crimson album Starless and Bible Black.

The compilation strategically omits all the b-sides that the band recorded as cover versions [which would necessitate this release being a 2CD version]: "Everybody's Happy Nowadays" (Buzzcocks) which appeared on the 12" of "Sheriff Fatman"; "Rent" (Pet Shop Boys), which appeared on the 12" of "Rubbish"; "Alternate Title" and "Randy Scouse Git" (The Monkees) from the 12" of "Anytime Anyplace Anywhere"; "Bedsitter" (Soft Cell) from "Bloodsport For All"; "Panic" (The Smiths) from "The Only Living Boy In New Cross"; "King Rocker" (Generation X), "Mannequin" (Wire) and "Down In The Tube Station At Midnight" (The Jam), all from "Do Re Me So Far So Good"; and "Hit" (The Sugarcubes), from "Lean On Me I Won't Fall Over", most of which appear on the 2007 compilation This Is the Sound of an Eclectic Guitar-A Collection of Other People's Songs.

Track listing
 "Is This The Only Way To Get Through To You" - 3:41
 "Granny Farming In The UK" - 4:18
 "R.S.P.C.E." - 3:07
 "Twin Tub With Guitar" - 3:04
 "Alternative Alf Garnett" - 2:56
 "Re Educating Rita" - 2:11
 "2001: A Clockwork Orange" - 1:57
 "The 90's Revival" - 2:04
 "A Nation Of Shoplifters" - 2:03
 "Watching The Big Apple Turn Over" - 3:30
 "Turn On Tune In And Switch Off" - 2:28
 "When Thesauruses Ruled The Earth" - 3:11
 "Bring On The Girls" - 2:53
 "Always The Bridesmaid Never The Bride" - 2:03
 "Her Song" - 2:27
 "Commercial Fucking Suicide (Part 1)" - 3:56
 "Stuff The Jubilee (1977)" - 2:02
 "Glam Rock Cops" - 3:41

References 

 Carter USM

Carter the Unstoppable Sex Machine albums
B-side compilation albums
1994 compilation albums
Chrysalis Records compilation albums